Jim Rooney (born 1 January 1956) was a Scottish footballer who played for Queen's Park, Morton, St. Mirren, Dumbarton, Clyde and East Stirling. Jim born in the East end of Glasgow, played over 500 Scottish league games, captained Scotland B national team in the four nations tournament in Italy 1984, managed by the late Jock Stein.  He is now retired and living on the west coast of Portugal with his family.

References

1956 births
Scottish footballers
Dumbarton F.C. players
Queen's Park F.C. players
East Stirlingshire F.C. players
Greenock Morton F.C. players
Clyde F.C. players
St Mirren F.C. players
Scottish Football League players
Living people
Association football midfielders